This was the first edition of the tournament.

Zdeněk Kolář and Adam Pavlásek won the title after defeating Karol Drzewiecki and Patrik Niklas-Salminen 6–3, 7–5 in the final.

Seeds

Draw

References

External links
 Main draw

Zug Open - Doubles